Acruspex is a genus of beetles in the family Cerambycidae, containing a single species, Acruspex spinipennis.

References

Piezocerini
Monotypic Cerambycidae genera